Blaž Furdi (born 27 May 1988) is a Slovenian former professional cyclist.

Major results

2008
3rd Trofeo Città di San Vendemiano
3rd Gara Ciclistica Montappone
2010
1st  Road race, National Under-23 Road Championships
1st Gran Premio Palio del Recioto
2nd Overall Istrian Spring Trophy
1st Stage 1
3rd Road race, National Road Championships
2011
2nd Raiffeisen Grand Prix
2nd Memoriał Henryka Łasaka
2nd Road race, National Road Championships
2012
2nd Tartu GP
3rd Tallinn-Tartu GP
3rd Trofeo Zsšdi

References

External links

1988 births
Living people
Slovenian male cyclists